The N-122 is a highway in Spain.  It connects Valladolid and Zaragoza to the Portugal–Spain border, where it connects to the A4 motorway (Portugal), this section was formerly the IP-4 and is now part of the European route E82 to Matosinhos.  The border is formed by the Rio Macãs it heads east crossing the Esla river to Zamora and the Duero river valley.  The N-630 crosses to the north and south.

After Zamora the N-122 follows the river passing Toro.  Most traffic now takes the Autovía A-11.  At Tordesillas there are junctions with the Autovía A-62 and Autovía A-6.  The road becomes the A-62 to Valladolid where it meets the N-601.  The road heads east as the A-11 and then after 14 km the N-122 again.  The road crosses to the south bank of the Rio Duero to the town and castle of Peñafiel.  It continues to Aranda de Duero and the Autovía A-1.  After 52 km the road meets the N-110 and heads north out of the Duero Valley past El Burgo de Osma onto Soria.  Here the road meets the  N-111 and N-234.  

To the northeast the road crosses Sierra del Morto by the Puerto del Madro and then heads through the Sierra del Moncayo.  The Parque natural de la Dehesa del Moncayo lies to the east.  The N-113 passes to the north.  The road heads into the Ebro valley passing the Monasterio de Veruela, overlooked by the Balcón de El Buste and the Santuario de Nuestra Sra. de la Misericordia.  The road ends at Junction 19 of the Autopista AP-68 and N-232 43 km north west of Zaragoza.

Settlements en route

 Magallón
 Borja
 Maleján
 Bulbuente
 Tarazona
 Torrellas
 Ágreda
 Matalebreras
 Villar del Campo
 Aldealpozo
  
 Soria
 Golmayo
 
 Villaciervos
 
 
 El Burgo de Osma
 San Esteban de Gormaz
 Velilla de San Esteban
 Langa de Duero
 Fresnillo de las Dueñas
 Aranda de Duero
 Castrillo de la Vega
 Fuentecén
 Nava de Roa
 Peñafiel
 
 Quintanilla de Arriba
 Quintanilla de Onésimo
 Sardón de Duero
 Tudela de Duero
 
 Valladolid
 Tordesillas
 
 
 Morales de Toro
 Toro
 
 Fresno de la Ribera
 Zamora
 Muelas del Pan
 Ricobayo
 Fonfría
 
 Alcañices
 
 Trabazos
 

National roads in Spain
Transport in Castile and León